The 2012 Alabama Crimson Tide baseball team represented the University of Alabama in the 2012 NCAA Division I baseball season.  The Crimson Tide play their home games in Sewell-Thomas Stadium.

Personnel

2012 Roster

2012 Alabama Crimson Tide Baseball Roster

Coaching Staff

Schedule and results

! style="background:#FFF;color:#8B0000;" | Regular Season
|- valign="top" 

|- bgcolor="#ffbbbb"
| 1 || February 17 ||  || Sewell-Thomas Stadium || 2–5 || R. Garton (1–0) || T. Guilbeau (0–1) || M. Sylvestri (1) || 4,864 || 0–1 || –
|- bgcolor="#ffbbbb"
| 2 || February 18 || Florida Atlantic|| Sewell-Thomas Stadium || 2–9 || J. Meiers (1–0) || C. Sullivan (0–1) || K. Alexander (1) || 3,073 || 0–2 || –
|- bgcolor="#ffbbbb"
| 3 || February 19 || Florida Atlantic || Sewell-Thomas Stadium || 4–9 || R. Alvarez (1–0) || J. Kamplain (0–1) || None || 3,043 || 0–3 || –
|- bgcolor="#ccffcc"
| 4 || February 24 ||  || Sewell-Thomas Stadium || 14–0 || T. Guilbeau (1–1) || T. Sechler (0–2) || None || 3,102 || 1–3 || –
|- bgcolor="#ccffcc"
| 5 || February 25 || Arkansas–Pine Bluff || Sewell-Thomas Stadium || 7–0 || C. Sullivan (1–1) || S. Jones (0–2) || None|| 3,202 || 2–3 || –
|- bgcolor="#ccffcc"
| 6 || February 26 || Arkansas–Pine Bluff || Sewell-Thomas Stadium || 9–3 || J. Kamplain (1–1) || M. Newby (0–2) || None || 3,209 || 3–3 || –
|- bgcolor="#ccffcc"
| 7 || February 28 ||  || Sewell-Thomas Stadium || 4–3 || J. Hubbard (1–0) || K. Bartsch (0–2) || I. Gardeck (1) || 3,011 || 4–3 || –
|- bgcolor="#ffbbbb"
| 8 || February 29 ||  || Pete Taylor Park || 2–14 || A. Pierce (1–1) || C. Nixon (0–1) || None || 3,9883 || 4–4 || –
|-

|- bgcolor="#ffbbbb"
| 9 || March 2 ||  || Turchin Stadium || 7–9 || A. Garner (3–0) || T. Pilkington (0–1) || D. Ponder (2) || 3,156 || 4–5 || –
|- bgcolor="#ccffcc"
| 10 || March 3 || Tulane || Turchin Stadium || 6–2 || C. Sullivan (2–1) || T. Mapes (0–1) || J. Hubbard (1) || 2,927 || 5–5 || –
|- bgcolor="#ffbbbb"
| 11 || March 4 || Tulane || Turchin Stadium || 2–7 ||A. Facundus (2–0) || I. Gardeck (0–1) || None || 3,495 || 5–6 || –
|- bgcolor="#ffbbbb"
| 12 || March 6† ||  || Riverwalk Stadium || 3–8 || J. Jacobs (3–0) || S. Turnbull (0–1) || J. Bryant (1) || 7,129 || 5–7 || –
|- bgcolor="#ffbbbb"
| 13 || March 9 ||  || Sewell-Thomas Stadium || 1–3 || K. Brandt (3–1) || C. Sullivan (2–2) || T. Merritt (2) || 3,390 || 5–8 || –
|- bgcolor="#ccffcc"
| 14 || March 10 || #24  || Sewell-Thomas Stadium || 7–6 || J. Hubbard (2–0) || M. Koch (0–1) || None|| 3,234 || 6–8 || –
|- bgcolor="#ffbbbb"
| 15 || March 11 ||  || Sewell-Thomas Stadium || 2–3 ||A. Gonzalez (1–0) || J. Hubbard (2–1) || M. Rush (2) || 3,111 || 6–9 || –
|- bgcolor="#ccffcc"
| 16 || March 13 ||  || Sewell-Thomas Stadium || 8–3 || I. Gardeck (1–1) || T. Nunez (1–2) || None|| 3,004 || 7–9 || –
|- bgcolor="#ccffcc"
| 17 || March 14 ||  || Sewell-Thomas Stadium || 6–5 || C. Otwell (1–0) || L. Rutledge (0–1) || None|| 3,071 || 8–9 || –
|- bgcolor="#ffbbbb"
| 18 || March 16 || #4 Arkansas || Baum Stadium || 3–412 || B. Astin (2–0) || J. Rosecrans (0–1) || None || 8,530 || 8–10 || 0–1
|- bgcolor="#ffbbbb"
| 19 || March 17 || #4 Arkansas || Baum Stadium || 4–8 || R. Stanek (5–0) || T. Guilbeau (1–2) || B. Moore (2) || 9,615 || 8–11 || 0–2
|- bgcolor="#ffbbbb"
| 20 || March 18 || #4 Arkansas || Baum Stadium || 4–7 || N. Sanburn (2–1) || T. Pilkington (0–2) || B. Astin (6) || 8,426 || 8–12 || 0–3
|- bgcolor="#ffbbbb"
| 21 || March 20 ||  || Riddle–Pace Field || 0–9 || N. Hill (3–1) || C. Baxter (0–1) || None || 2,936 || 8–13 || –
|- bgcolor="#ffbbbb"
| 22 || March 23 || #17  || Sewell-Thomas Stadium || 7–11 || D. Chavez (2–0) || I. Gardeck (1–2) || None || 4,123 || 8–14 || 0–4
|- bgcolor="#ccffcc"
| 23 || March 24 || #17 Ole Miss || Sewell-Thomas Stadium || 3–2 || T. Guilbeau (2–2) || B. Huber (0–1) || None || 4,249 || 9–14 ||1–4
|- bgcolor="#ffbbbb"
| 24 || March 25 || #17 Ole Miss || Sewell-Thomas Stadium || 4–8 || D. Chavez (3–0) || S. Turnbull (0–2) || None || 4,089 || 9–15 ||1–5
|- bgcolor="#ffbbbb"
| 25 || March 27 || || Regions Park || 0–112 || J. German (3–0) || N. Kennedy (0–1) || None || 2,224 || 9–16 ||–
|- bgcolor="#ffbbbb"
| 26 || March 30 ||  || Lindsey Nelson Stadium ||8–10 || C. Watson (2–0) || J. Shaw (0–1) || N. Blount (4) || 1,981 || 9–17||1–6
|- bgcolor="#ffbbbb"
| 27 || March 31 || Tennessee || Lindsey Nelson Stadium ||2–4 || D. Steckenrider (3–0) || J. Kamplain (1–2) || N. Blount (5) || 2,008 || 9–18||1–7
|-

|- bgcolor="#ffbbbb"
| 28 || April 1 ||  || Lindsey Nelson Stadium ||3–5 || C. Watson (3–0) || J. Keller (0–1) || N. Blount (6) || 2,424 || 9–19||1–8
|- bgcolor="#ccffcc"
| 29 || April 3 ||  || Stanky Field ||9–5 || S. Turnbull (1–2) || J. Dennis (1–3) || None || 2,359|| 10–19 ||–
|- bgcolor="#ccffcc"
| 30 || April 6 ||#23  || Sewell-Thomas Stadium ||10–6 || T. Guilbeau (3–2) || D. Varnadore (1–4) || None || 5,258|| 11–19 ||2–8
|- bgcolor="#ccffcc"
| 31 || April 7 ||#23 Auburn || Sewell-Thomas Stadium ||4–3 || T. Pilkington (1–0) || S. Smith (2–4) || None || 4,541|| 12–19 ||3–8
|- bgcolor="#ccffcc"
| 32 || April 8 ||#23 Auburn || Sewell-Thomas Stadium || 6–2 || J. Keller (1–1) || D. Koger (2–2) || J. Hubbard (2) || 3,074|| 13–19 ||4–8
|- bgcolor="#ffbbbb"
| 33 || April 10 ||  || Sewell-Thomas Stadium || 1–9 || || || ||  ||13–20 ||–
|- bgcolor="#bbbbbb"
| 34 || April 11 ||  || Alumni Field || colspan=7 |Cancelled
|- bgcolor="#ffbbbb"
| 35 || April 13 ||#4 LSU || Alex Box Stadium ||2–10  || || || ||  ||13–21 ||4–9
|- bgcolor="#ffbbbb"
| 36 || April 14 ||#4 LSU || Alex Box Stadium || 1–7 || || || ||  || 13–22 ||4–10
|- bgcolor="#ffbbbb"
| 37 || April 15 ||#4 LSU ||  Alex Box Stadium ||1–5 || || || ||  ||13–23 ||4–11
|- bgcolor="#ccffcc"
| 38 || April 17 ||  || Sewell-Thomas Stadium || 8–0 || || || ||  ||14–23 ||–
|- bgcolor="#ffbbbb"
| 39 || April 18 || MS Valley St. ||Sewell-Thomas Stadium || 3–8 || || || ||  || 14–24 ||–
|- bgcolor="#ccffcc"
| 40 || April 20 ||  || Sewell-Thomas Stadium || 6–4 || || || ||  ||15–24 ||5–11
|- bgcolor="#ccffcc"
| 41 || April 21 || Vanderbilt || Sewell-Thomas Stadium ||8–6 || || || ||  ||16–24 ||6–11
|- bgcolor="#ffbbbb"
| 42 || April 22 || Vanderbilt || Sewell-Thomas Stadium || 7–9 || || || ||  || 16–25  ||6–12
|- bgcolor="#ccffcc"
| 43 || April 24 ||  || Griffin Stadium || 5–4 || || || ||  ||17–25   ||–
|- bgcolor="#ffbbbb"
| 44 || April 26 ||#7 South Carolina || Carolina Stadium || 0–1|| || ||  ||  || 17–26 ||6–13
|- bgcolor="#ffbbbb"
| 45 || April 27 ||#7 South Carolina ||Carolina Stadium || 11–12 || || || ||  || 17–27 ||6–14
|- bgcolor="#ffbbbb"
| 46 || April 28 ||#7 South Carolina || Carolina Stadium ||1–9  || || || ||  ||17–28  ||6–15
|-

|- bgcolor="#ffbbbb"
| 47 || May 4 || Mississippi State || Sewell-Thomas Stadium || 1–3 || || || ||  || 17–29 ||6–16
|- bgcolor="#ffbbbb"
| 48 || May 5 || Mississippi State || Sewell-Thomas Stadium || 2–3 || || || ||  || 17–30 ||6–17
|- bgcolor="#ccffcc"
| 49 || May 6 || Mississippi State || Sewell-Thomas Stadium || 8–7 || || || ||  || 18–30 ||7–17
|- bgcolor="#ffbbbb"
| 50 || May 11 || Kentucky || Cliff Hagan Stadium || 2–4 || || || ||  || 18–31 ||7–18
|- bgcolor="#ffbbbb"
| 51 || May 12 || Kentucky || Cliff Hagan Stadium ||6–7  || || || ||  || 18–32 ||7–19
|- bgcolor="#ffbbbb"
| 52 || May 13 || Kentucky || Cliff Hagan Stadium ||  1–8|| || || ||  || 18–33 ||7–20
|- bgcolor="#ccffcc"
| 53 || May 15 ||  || Sewell-Thomas Stadium || 10–5 || || || ||  || 19–33 ||–
|- bgcolor="#ffbbbb"
| 54 || May 17 ||  || Sewell-Thomas Stadium || 4–8 || || || ||  || 19–34 ||7–21
|- bgcolor="#ccffcc"
| 55 || May 18 || Georgia || Sewell-Thomas Stadium || 4–0 || || || ||  || 20–34 ||8–21
|- bgcolor="#ccffcc"
| 56 || May 19 || Georgia || Sewell-Thomas Stadium || 6–4 || || || ||  || 21–34 ||9–21
|-

|† Indicates the game does not count toward the 2012 Southeastern Conference standings.*Rankings are based on the team's current  ranking in the Baseball America poll the week Alabama faced each opponent.

Awards and honors

 Taylor Dugas
 Perfect Game USA preseason All-American; 2nd team
 Lowe's Senior CLASS Award candidate

 Justin Kamplain 
 SEC Freshman of the Week; March 26

 Ben Moore
 SEC Freshman of the Week; February 27

Alabama Crimson Tide in the 2012 MLB Draft
The following members of the Alabama Crimson Tide baseball program were drafted in the 2012 MLB Draft.

See also
 Alabama Crimson Tide baseball
 2012 NCAA Division I baseball season
 2012 Alabama Crimson Tide softball season

References

Alabama Crimson Tide Baseball Team, 2012
Alabama Crimson Tide baseball seasons
Alabama Crimson Tide baseball team